Mimamblesthidus orientalis is a species of beetle in the family Cerambycidae, and the only species in the genus Mimamblesthidus. It was described by Breuning in 1961.

References

Apomecynini
Beetles described in 1961
Monotypic beetle genera